Kalateh-ye Susnari-ye Bala (also Romanized as Kalāteh-ye Sūsnārī-ye Bālā; also known as Sūsnārī-ye Bālā) is a village in Bajestan Rural District, in the Central District of Bajestan County, Razavi Khorasan Province, Iran. At the 2006 census, its population was 24, in 8 families.

References 

Populated places in Bajestan County